Discreet may refer to:

 Discreet Logic, a subsidiary of Autodesk Media and Entertainment
 DiscReet Records
 Discreet (film), a 2017 film

See also 
 Discrete